Paystack is a Nigerian financial technology company that offers payment processing services to businesses and was acquired by Irish-American financial services company Stripe for $200M in 2020. Its headquarters is located in Lagos, Nigeria.

History 
Paystack was founded in 2015 by Shola Akinlade and Ezra Olubi who met at Babcock University and worked in banking and IT before founding Paystack. In November 2015, it became the first Nigerian company to be accepted into the startup accelerator Y Combinator. It expanded to Ghana in 2018 and to South Africa in 2021.

Funding 
In 2016, it raised $1.3M seed funding from Tencent and other investors.  In 2018, it raised $8M in a Series A funding led by Irish-American financial services company Stripe.  It was acquired in 2020 by Stripe for $200M in a bid to extend Stripe's reach in Africa. Before the acquisition, Paystack was reported to have been used by over 60,000 businesses in Nigeria and Ghana for the collection of online and offline payments.

Partnerships 

 Paystack launched a payments solution integrated with E-commerce platform Shopify to allow more African retailers to sell their goods on the platform in 2016.
 It was selected as the preferred payment partner of open-source eCommerce solution WooCommerce in 2021.
 It launched Pay with Apple Pay on its platform in 2021.
 It launched a partnership with Accounting software solution Xero in 2022 that will allow Xero users in Africa to add a 'Pay with Paystack' button to their Xero invoices.

See also 

Interswitch
PayPal
Stripe (company)
E-commerce payment system
List of online payment service providers
Payment service provider

References 

Nigerian companies established in 2015
Financial technology companies of Nigeria
Y Combinator companies